Amos is an American Christian rock band. They released their first record in February 2003.

Their debut CD in February 2003, For Life the Dream to Live was  a full-length concept album about how even the most sinful can be redeemed.

In April 2005, their national debut radio single "Indian Song" from For Life the Dream to Live, Amos' debut CD, reached number 7 on the American Christian Music Exchange Alternative Tracks & Singles charts and has been featured on more than 50 Christian rock and college radio stations across the U.S.

In April 2006 they released "Rise Above", the band's first single from their second CD, Faith Knows No Fear. It reached number 3 on Radio Active Journal's Christian indie chart.

The band has also shared the stage with many popular national acts including Newsboys (Sparrow), 10,000 Maniacs (Elektra), Spin Doctors (Sony), Fastball (Hollywood), Cary Pierce (Aware Records) and others.

A cornerstone of Amos success is their live show. They were nominated for best live performance of 2003 by Spin 180s Listener Choice Awards, a nationally syndicated Christian rock radio program.  The band was also nominated for Band of the Month by Christian Indies MAGazine in February 2004.

Amos has developed and hosted three charity music festivals titled Amos Fest I, Amos Fest II and Amos Fest III. The festivals showcased top D/FW bands and have attracted more than 600 people in attendance. To date the GRAMMY Foundation, Young Life and Boy Scouts of America have been beneficiaries.

Amos released their second CD Faith Knows No Fear on the (Faith, Hope and Love Label) in May 2006.

Amos is made up of:
 Christian Coffield  lead vocals & guitar;
Tom Coffield  lead guitar & background vocals;
Dan Slider  bass & background vocals;
Mark Slider  keyboards & special efx;
Dan Yost  drums.

The Coffield brothers started the band as an alternative rock group that focused on both gospel and rock markets. The band broke up in 2007.

American Christian rock groups